Conomurex persicus, common name : the Persian conch, is a species of sea snail, a marine gastropod mollusk in the family Strombidae, the true conchs.

Description
The shell size varies between 35 mm and 75 mm

Distribution
This species is found in the Mediterranean Sea along Greece, as alien species immigrated by Suez Canal (Albano et al., 2021) in the Arabian Sea and the Persian Gulf.

References

 Gofas, S.; Le Renard, J.; Bouchet, P. (2001). Mollusca, in: Costello, M.J. et al. (Ed.) (2001). European register of marine species: a check-list of the marine species in Europe and a bibliography of guides to their identification. Collection Patrimoines Naturels, 50: pp. 180–213
 Streftaris, N.; Zenetos, A.; Papathanassiou, E. (2005). Globalisation in marine ecosystems: the story of non-indigenous marine species across European seas. Oceanogr. Mar. Biol. Annu. Rev. 43: 419-453 (look up in IMIS)

External links
 

Strombidae
Gastropods described in 1821